Galileo is a 1975 biographical film about the 16th- and 17th-century scientist Galileo Galilei, whose astronomical observations with the newly invented telescope led to a profound conflict with the Roman Catholic Church. The film is an adaptation of Bertolt Brecht's 1943 play of the same name. The film was produced by Ely Landau for the American Film Theatre, which presented thirteen film adaptations of plays in the United States from 1973 to 1975. Brecht's play was recently called a "masterpiece" by veteran theater critic Michael Billington, as Martin Esslin had in 1960.  The film's director, Joseph Losey, had also directed the first performances of the play in 1947 in the US — with Brecht's active participation. The film is fairly true to those first performances, and is thus of historical significance as well.

Plot

The film closely follows the "American" version of Brecht's play Galileo. In 1609 Galileo is a mathematics professor in Padua, Italy. While his salary is inadequate, he possesses the freedom to pursue controversial scientific studies under the protection of the Venetian Republic. Part of his work involves the use of a telescope, a relatively new scientific instrument brought from the Netherlands. Using the telescope, Galileo seeks to test the theories put forth by Nicolaus Copernicus that place the Sun – and not the Earth – at the center of universe. As his research progress, Galileo accepts a more prestigious academic position in Florence, Italy. But his new position does not come with the government protection he enjoyed in Venice, and his friends in the higher echelons of the Roman Catholic Church refuse to come to his aid when he is summoned before the Inquisition.

Production

Development and screenplay
Joseph Losey had a long relationship with Bertolt Brecht that commenced in the 1930s and culminated with the 1947 stage performances of Galileo. After these, Losey mainly worked as a film director. Losey was blacklisted in the US in the early 1950s due to his political activities, which effectively ended his career in the US film industry. He emigrated to England, where he was able to re-establish his career. Over the years he made several efforts to produce a film based on Brecht's play. These were finally realized when Losey was engaged to direct a film of Galileo for the 1974–1975 season of the American Film Theatre. In its two seasons, American Film Theater presented thirteen film adaptations based on well-known plays. By design, these were not films of stage productions — they were plays "translated to the film medium, but with complete faithfulness to the original play script."  While the films were intended for US movie theaters, Galileo was produced in England.

The screenplay for Galileo was written by Barbara Bray and Losey. Bray had a long career as an  editor, translator, and critic. She is also noted as the longtime companion and mistress of Samuel Beckett, who won the Nobel Prize in Literature in 1969. Besides Galileo, she wrote two other screenplays with Losey. Their screenplay for Galileo relies primarily on the "American" version of Brecht's play that was first performed in 1947. This English language version was written between 1944 and 1947 by Brecht with Charles Laughton, his collaborator and translator. The play was produced in Los Angeles, California and then in New York City, with Laughton (a famed film actor) starring as Galileo. The play was first published in 1952. Bray and Losey's screenplay made changes in this version that reflect the ultimate 1956 "Berlin version" (in German), as well as the English translation of the Berlin version and additional materials published by Ralph Manheim and John Willett in 1972. Scene 14 from the 1947 play was dropped from the film version.

Casting
Casting for the American Film Theatre films was unusual. As described by Raymond Benson, "The talent (directors, actors, designers, technicians) was asked to work at a reduced rate or at scale.  No one refused.  It was for a cause they all thought was worthwhile.  Lee Marvin, for example, joked that he 'lost $225,000' by starring in The Iceman Cometh (which meant he did the movie for only $25,000—his going rate at the time was $250,000)."

For Galileo, Losey and producer Ely Landau were able to secure several well-known actors for roles major and minor:
Topol played Galileo Galilei. He had enjoyed great popularity after his starring role in the film production of Fiddler on the Roof (1971).
Georgia Brown played the Ballad Singer's wife. Brown was noted for her work in musical theater (she was nominated for a Tony Award for Oliver! in 1963, and as a film actress (she was nominated for a BAFTA Award for The Raging Moon (1971)). 
Edward Fox played the Cardinal Inquisitor. His work with Losey on The Go-Between (1971) had won him a BAFTA award.  
Sir John Gielgud played the Old Cardinal. He had been knighted in 1953 for his distinguished acting career.
Margaret Leighton played an elderly Court Lady. Her work with Losey on The Go-Between (1971) had won her a BAFTA award and an Oscar nomination.
Tom Conti played the adult Andrea Sarti. In the first scenes, Sarti is a child and the son of Galileo's housekeeper. As an adult he is Galileo's protege.
Patrick Magee played Cardinal Robert Bellarmine, an historical figure in the Galileo affair who was sympathetic to Galileo's scientific work, but warned him to avoid explicit conflict with the church doctrine. Bellarmine had been one of the judges at the trial of Giordano Bruno for heresy by the Roman Inquisition. Among the charges against Bruno was his espousal of "cosmic pluralism", which holds that the earth is only one of many planets. Following Bruno's conviction, he was burned at the stake in 1600. There are several allusions to this event in Brecht's play.
John McEnery played Federzoni. Nominated for a BAFTA Award for Franco Zeffirelli's Romeo and Juliet (1968).
Michael Lonsdale played the historical figure of Cardinal Maffeo Barberini, who became Pope Urban VIII in 1623. In the film, while Barberini is protective of Galileo when he is a Cardinal, after he becomes Pope he sanctions Galileo's trial by the Roman Inquisition.
Clive Revill played the Ballad Singer. Revill had worked with Losey previously on Modesty Blaise (1966).
Job Stewart played a Monk-Scholar.

Music

For the 1947 stage production, Hanns Eisler composed music for a series of songs that were sung by a trio of boys at the beginning of each of the fourteen different scenes of the play. In addition, the ninth scene is a musical entertainment occurring on April Fool's Day, 1632. Historically, 1632 was one year before Galileo was convicted of heresy by the Roman Inquisition. The Ballad Singer and his wife sing about Galileo's effect on civil order to a rowdy crowd. Eisler composed the music for the ballad, which included orchestration for seventeen instruments. A recording of Eisler himself singing this ballad has been released, together with many other recordings related to the collaboration of Laughton, Brecht, and Eisler. Since 1930, Eisler had been Brecht's close friend and collaborator, and their collaboration continued after they had both decamped from Hollywood to East Berlin.

The film retains both the songs for boys' voices and the ballad. During production of the film, it was discovered that the scores for most of the instruments in Eisler's orchestration of the ballad were lost. Losey had Richard Hartley finish the orchestration anew. The Ballad Singer was played by Clive Revill, and his wife by Georgia Brown. The orchestra is apparently uncredited.

Filming and post-production
Joseph Losey had been the director for the 1947 theatrical productions. He was selected by Brecht himself, and he gained an intimate knowledge of Brecht's intentions for the play. Referring to the first production in Los Angeles, John Houseman said later, "Joe was to be the director of this, which really meant ... that actually Brecht would produce and direct himself with aid from Charles Laughton." James Lyon comments that "Because he was willing to learn, Losey qualified as Brecht's kind of director. He seems to have been one of the rare theater and film people in America who recognized Brecht's genius at once and at least partially understood him." Losey produced and directed the subsequent New York production after Brecht had left the US. He wrote at the time, "It is such a great play, so clean and clear and architectural ... what I have worked for and prepared for my entire life."

In Losey's film version he maintained several theatrical concepts that had been part of the 1947 theatrical production. These included the use of a trio of young boys whose songs preview parts of the plot, and also the staging of Galileo's recantation against a shadow-filled white screen (cyclorama). Losey's opening shot, an overhead view of the film sound stage, also calls attention to the theatricality of the production. At times, the film's characters speak directly at the camera to address the audience.

Losey's long-time collaborator Reginald Beck was the film's editor. Critic Tom Milne remarked that the "smooth theatrical continuity tends to blunt the raw edges of Brecht's distancing effects".

Release and reception
Galileo was the initial offering of the American Film Theatre's second season that commenced in January 1975. The film was shown at the 1975 Cannes Film Festival, but was not entered into the main competition.

Several critics have admired the film's success in adapting Brecht's important play for the cinema. Roger Ebert wrote in 1975, "Brecht's Galileo bears only a sporadic resemblance to the facts of the great man's life. But no matter: What Brecht was after, and what the new American Film Theater version of his play does a pretty good job of delivering, was a drama of ideas, not biography." Vincent Canby noted particularly the "hugely theatrical scene in which the Pope (Michael Lonsdale) is being robed for an audience and trying not to give in to the Inquisitor's arguments to do something about Galileo." Writing in 2012,  Alex von Tunzelmann commented: "Adapted from Bertolt Brecht's intelligent, gutsy play, this film is a smart take on Galileo's life."

On the other hand, many critics have reacted negatively to the performance by Topol as Galileo. Jay Cocks, reviewing the film for Time in 1975, wrote: "Topol misses the role's strength, both in character and intellect. Most of the actors around him, however, are superb: John Gielgud, Margaret Leighton, Edward Fox, Patrick Magee, John McEnery." Canby, writing in The New York Times in 1975, complained: "There is one problem with the film, and it is a major one; the casting of Topol in the title role ... although he's a big man he imparts no sense of intellectual heft. ... but the rest of the production has exceptional style and intelligence, the sort of things one should be able to expect from the American Film Theater."

The original 1947 theatrical performance, also directed by Losey, received a similar criticism, only then it was Charles Laughton who played Galileo. Tom Milne makes this a criticism of Losey's directing, writing that "Topol is allowed to get away with presenting Galileo as a hero, which makes nonsense of Brecht's condemnation of him as a coward for his betrayal of science". Some recent reviewers have been much more positive about Topol's performance, including von Tunzelmann and Robert Benson.

Martin Walsh added a different perspective, writing in 1975 that "Losey may not be the radical director Brecht deserves. But his production is consistently restrained and allows the incomparable intelligence of Brecht's text to thrust through to us."

Home media

The first release of the film to home media didn't occur until 2003, when Kino International produced region 1 DVDs of all fourteen films from American Film Theatre. The Galileo DVD includes interviews with Topol and producer Otto Plaschke. The DVD box art lists different actors than were highlighted in the original 1975 theatrical release poster. The DVD transfer was reviewed by Noel Megahey in 2004.

The release of the DVD gave rise to a new round of reviews of the film, both negative and positive.

See also
Galileo (1968) is an Italian film about the Galileo affair written and directed by Liliana Cavani. See the article by Cristina Olivotto and Antonella Testa for a comparison of the 1968 and 1975 films.

References

Further reading
 Contains unsigned notes that give details of the production and difficulties with distribution of the second season of American Film Theatre films.

External links

Cultural depictions of Galileo Galilei
1975 films
Films shot at EMI-Elstree Studios
1970s English-language films
1970s biographical drama films
British films based on plays
Films based on works by Bertolt Brecht
Films directed by Joseph Losey
Films produced by Ely Landau
Films set in the 17th century
British biographical drama films
Biographical films about scientists
1975 drama films
1970s British films